Suzhou International Financial Square is a supertall skyscraper designed by Kohn Pedersen Fox Associates in the Suzhou Industrial Park, Jiangsu, located to the east of Jinji Lake. It is a multi-purpose building which includes apartments, hotels and offices. It is also the tallest building in Suzhou.

Gallery

See also 
 Suzhou Zhongnan Center
 List of tallest buildings in Suzhou
 List of tallest buildings in China

References 

Skyscrapers in Suzhou
Suzhou Industrial Park
Buildings and structures under construction in China
Skyscraper office buildings in China
Residential skyscrapers in China
Skyscraper hotels in Suzhou